September 28 - Eastern Orthodox liturgical calendar - September 30

All fixed commemorations below celebrated on October 12 by Orthodox Churches on the Old Calendar.

For September 29th, Orthodox Churches on the Old Calendar commemorate the Saints listed on September 16.

Saints
 The Eighty (80) Holy Martyrs of Byzantium, burnt in a marine vessel during the reign of Emperor Valens (364-378)
 Martyrs Tryphon, Trophimus, and Dorymedon, and 150 Martyrs, in Palestine.
 Martyr Theodota of Philippi.
 Martyr Petronia, by the sword.
 Martyr Gudelia (Govdelia) of Persia (4th century)
 Martyrs Dada, Gabdelas, and Casdoe (Kazdoa) of Persia (4th century)
 Saint Cyriacus the Anchorite, Hermit, of Palestine (556)
 Saint Theophanes the Merciful of Gaza.

Pre-Schism Western saints
 Saint Fraternus, Bishop of Auxerre in France and by tradition a martyr (450)
 Saint Ludwin (Leudwinus, Liutwin, Leodwin), Founder of Mettlach in Germany and then Bishop of Trier (c. 713)
 Saints Catholdus, Anno and Diethardus, three monks who preached the Gospel around Eichstätt in Germany (late 8th century)
 Saint Alaricus (Adalricus, Adalrai), a monk at Einsiedeln Abbey in Switzerland, later a hermit on the island of Uffnau in the lake of Zurich (975)

Post-Schism Orthodox saints
 Saint Cyprian, Abbot, of Ustiug in Vologda (1276)
 New Hieromartyr Malachi of Rhodes, tortured and roasted on a spit over live coals (1500)
 Venerable monk-martyrs in the Strofades (1530 or 1537)
 Saint Onuphrius the Wonderworker, of Gareji, Georgia (1733)
 Three New Martyrs of Vrachori, Agrinio (1786)

New martyrs and confessors
 New Hieromartyr John (Pommer), Archbishop of Riga in Latvia (1934)

Other commemorations
 Translation of the relics of St. Donatus, Bishop of Euroea in Epirus (387), from the Church of Santa Maria e San Donato in Venice to Paramythia in Greece. 
 Uncovering of the relics (1993) of St. John (Maximovitch), Archbishop of Shanghai and San Francisco (1966).
 Repose of Blessed Anthony Alexeyevich, Fool-for-Christ, of Zadonsk (1851)
 Repose of Archimandrite Gerasim (Schmaltz) of Alaska (1969)

Icon gallery

Notes

References

Sources
 September 29/October 12. Orthodox Calendar (PRAVOSLAVIE.RU).
 October 12 / September 29. HOLY TRINITY RUSSIAN ORTHODOX CHURCH (A parish of the Patriarchate of Moscow).
 September 29. OCA - The Lives of the Saints.
 The Autonomous Orthodox Metropolia of Western Europe and the Americas (ROCOR). St. Hilarion Calendar of Saints for the year of our Lord 2004. St. Hilarion Press (Austin, TX). pp. 72–73.
 The Twenty-Ninth Day of the Month of September. Orthodoxy in China.
 September 29. Latin Saints of the Orthodox Patriarchate of Rome.
 The Roman Martyrology. Transl. by the Archbishop of Baltimore. Last Edition, According to the Copy Printed at Rome in 1914. Revised Edition, with the Imprimatur of His Eminence Cardinal Gibbons. Baltimore: John Murphy Company, 1916. pp. 300–301.
 Rev. Richard Stanton. A Menology of England and Wales, or, Brief Memorials of the Ancient British and English Saints Arranged According to the Calendar, Together with the Martyrs of the 16th and 17th Centuries. London: Burns & Oates, 1892. pp. 462–466.

 Greek Sources
 Great Synaxaristes:  29 ΣΕΠΤΕΜΒΡΙΟΥ. ΜΕΓΑΣ ΣΥΝΑΞΑΡΙΣΤΗΣ.
  Συναξαριστής. 29 Σεπτεμβρίου. ECCLESIA.GR. (H ΕΚΚΛΗΣΙΑ ΤΗΣ ΕΛΛΑΔΟΣ).
  29/09/2016. Ορθόδοξος Συναξαριστής.

 Russian Sources
  12 октября (29 сентября). Православная Энциклопедия под редакцией Патриарха Московского и всея Руси Кирилла (электронная версия). (Orthodox Encyclopedia - Pravenc.ru).
  29 сентября по старому стилю / 12 октября по новому стилю. Русская Православная Церковь - Православный церковный календарь на 2016 год.

September in the Eastern Orthodox calendar